Kasino Hadiwibowo (15 September 1950 – 18 December 1997), commonly called as Kasino Warkop, was an Indonesian actor and comedian who was a member of the comedy group Warkop.

Early life
Kasino was born in Gombong, Kebumen, Central Java to Notopramono and Kasiyem. During his youth he had to move around because he followed his father who was an employee at PNKA (now PT. KAI). Initially he attended SD Budi Utomo, Jakarta and continued to SMP Negeri 51 Jakarta. When he was in high school, he followed his father who was assigned to Cirebon and attended SMA Negeri 2 Cirebon before finally moving to SMA Negeri 22 Jakarta until he graduated. Kasino then continued his education at the Faculty of Social Sciences, Department of Commerce Administration, University of Indonesia.

The presence of Kasino with the Warkop group provides a breath of fresh air for the Indonesian comedy entertainment business. The Warkop group represents a generation of educated comedians, who have a new characteristic in comedy. Career in the film they pioneered in the late 1970s skyrocketed. In the film Maju Kena Mundur Kena, the Warkop trio are among the highest-paid actors in Indonesia.

When he was a student, Kasino spent a lot of time on mountain slopes with the University of Indonesia Nature Lovers Student Group (Mapala UI), with Dono and Nanu.

Death
Kasino's health began to show a decline in November 1996. While attending an event in Bandung, Kasino fell unconscious and he was then rushed to Bandung Adventist Hospital. The results of the X-ray examination by doctor showed evidence of tumor symptoms in the brain and Kasino was advised to undergo chemotherapy. Kasino's daughter, Hanna, said that her father's tumor probably stemmed from a mountain biking accident that occurred a few years earlier. As a consequence of the chemotherapy process, Kasino was forced to be absent from the Warkop DKI TV series and the script only focused on Dono and Indro. In 1997, Kasino health had ups and downs but did not discourage him. He also briefly appeared again in the Warkop DKI series by wearing a wig to cover the baldness on his head due to the chemotherapy process. In November 1997, Kasino's health deteriorated again and he was admitted to Dr. Cipto Mangunkusumo Hospital. After almost a month of treatment, Kasino passed away on 18 Desember 1997 after a year of suffering from a brain tumor. He was 47 years old at the time. His body was buried in Tajur Halang, Bogor Regency.

Filmography

In popular culture
 In Warkop DKI Reborn: Jangkrik Boss! Part 1 and Warkop DKI Reborn: Jangkrik Boss! Part 2, Kasino played by Vino G. Bastian.
 In Warkop DKI Reborn 3 and Warkop DKI Reborn 4, Kasino played by Adipati Dolken.

See also
 List of people with brain tumors

References

External links

1950 births
1997 deaths
People from Kebumen Regency
Javanese people
University of Indonesia alumni
Indonesian male comedians
Indonesian comedians
Indonesian male film actors
Indonesian male television actors
Indonesian Muslims
Deaths from brain cancer in Indonesia